Taras Kuzio (born 1958) is a British academic and expert in Ukrainian political, economic and security affairs. He is Professor of Political Science at National University of Kyiv-Mohyla Academy (Kyiv, Ukraine).

Education

Taras Kuzio is of Ukrainian descent.

He received a BA in economics from the University of Sussex, an MA in Soviet studies from the University of London and holds a doctorate in political science from the University of Birmingham; he was a postdoctoral fellow at Yale University.

Career

In 1986, Kuzio, based in London, began compiling and translating information on current events in Soviet Ukraine and provided this information to the media through the Ukraine Press Agency (UPA) in Great Britain. UPA was a branch of the officially British-registered company Society for Soviet Nationalities Studies, which published the bi-monthly Soviet Nationalities Survey (which had been launched in 1984 and continued until 1991) and monthly Soviet Ukrainian Affairs (1987-89). Unbeknownst to Kuzio, this was funded by the CIA as part of their QRPLUMB Project, although the CIA had no editorial input.

In 1992-93, Kuzio worked as a research fellow at the International Institute for Strategic Studies. From 1993-95, he served as editor of the Ukrainian Business Review and directed the Ukrainian Business Agency. From 1995-98, he was a senior research fellow with the Centre for Russian and Eastern European Studies at the University of Birmingham in England, where he completed his PhD on nation- and state-building in Ukraine. In the second half of the 1990s, he was a senior research fellow at the Council of Advisers to the Ukrainian Parliament.

From 1998-99, he was director of the NATO Information and Documentation Center in Kyiv, Ukraine. He served as a long-term observer for the Organization for Security and Co-operation in Europe during the 1998 and 2002 parliamentary elections in Ukraine, and as a National Democratic Institute observer in the 2004 Ukrainian presidential elections.

In 2004-06, he was a visiting professor in George Washington University's Elliott School of International Affairs' Institute for European, Russian and Eurasian Studies (IERES).

In 2010-11, he was an Austrian Marshall Plan Foundation Visiting Fellow at the Center for Transatlantic Relations, School of Advanced International Studies, Johns Hopkins University in Washington D.C.

In 2011-12, he was a visiting fellow at the Slavic Research Center at Hokkaido University in Japan. Currently,  he is a senior research associate at the Canadian Institute of Ukrainian Studies, University of Alberta.

His most recent book is Russian Nationalism and the Russian-Ukrainian War (2022), which was published prior to the 2022 Russian invasion of Ukraine. This follows two other books on Russia-Ukraine relations: Putin's War Against Ukraine: Revolution, Nationalism and Crime (2017) and Ukraine: Democratisation, Corruption and the New Russian Imperialism (June 2015), the latter of which surveys modern Ukrainian political history. He is the author and editor of sixteen books, including Open Ukraine. Changing Course towards a European Future Democratic Revolution in Ukraine (2011), From Kuchmagate to Orange Revolution (2007), Theoretical and Comparative Perspectives on Nationalism (2007) and Ukraine-Crimea-Russia: Triangle of Conflict (2007). He has also comparatively researched empire loyalism in Northern Ireland and Donbas.

He is an associate research fellow at the UK Henry Jackson Society thinktank and has contributed to the Atlantic Council, Foreign Affairs, Kyiv Post, New Eastern Europe, and E-International Relations.

Selected publications
Volumes Authored
 Russian Nationalism and the Russian-Ukrainian War (Routledge, 2022), pp. 280 — 
 Putin's War Against Ukraine: Revolution, Nationalism and Crime (CreateSpace Independent Publishing Platform, 2017)
 Ukraine: Democratisation, Corruption and the New Russian Imperialism (Santa Barbara, CA: Praeger, 2015), pp. 611.
 Theoretical and Comparative Perspectives on Nationalism: New Directions in Cross-Cultural and Post-Communist Studies. Soviet and Post-Soviet Politics and Society series 71 (Hannover: Ibidem-Verlag, 2007), pp. 423.
 Ukraine-Crimea-Russia: Triangle of Conflict, Soviet and Post-Soviet Politics and Society series (Hannover: Ibidem-Verlag, 2007), pp. 223.
 Ukraine. Perestroika to Independence, Second Edition (London: Macmillan, New York: St. Martin's Press, 1994 and 2000), pp. 273.
 Ukraine. State and Nation Building.  Routledge Studies of Societies in Transition  9  (London and New York: Routledge, 1998), pp. 298.
 Ukraine under Kuchma: Political Reform, Economic Transformation and Security Policy in Independent Ukraine (London: Macmillan and New York: St. Martin’s Press, 1997), pp. 281.
 Ukrainian Security Policy. Washington Paper 167 (Washington DC: The Center for Strategic & International Studies and Praeger, 1995), pp. 168.
Volumes Co-Authored   
 (with Paul D’Anieri and Robert Krawchuk) Politics and Society in Ukraine. Westview Series on the Post-Soviet Republics (Boulder, CO: Westview Press, 1999), pp. 332.
Think Tank Monographs
 The Crimea: Europe’s Next Flashpoint? (Washington DC: The Jamestown Foundation, November 2010), p. 38.
 EU and Ukraine: a turning point in 2004? ISS-EU Occasional Paper (Paris: Institute for Security Studies-EU, December 2003), p. 36.
 Ukraine. Back From the Brink, European Security Study 23 (London:  Institute for European Defence and Security Studies, 1995), p. 39.
 Russia-Crimea-Ukraine. Triangle of Conflict, Conflict Studies 267 (London: Research Institute for the Study of Conflict and terrorism, 1994), p. 35.
 Ukraine. The Unfinished Revolution. European Security Study 16 (London:  Institute for European Defence and Security Studies, 1992), p. 41.
 Dissent in Ukraine under Gorbachev (A Collection of samizdat documents)'' (London: Ukrainian Press Agency, 1989), p. 53.

References

External links

 ORCID page

Living people
Ukrainian studies
People from Halifax, West Yorkshire
British people of Ukrainian descent
1958 births
Alumni of the University of London
Alumni of the University of Birmingham
Alumni of the University of Sussex
Historians of Ukraine